Get There may refer to:

Get There (Bôa album), 2005
Get There (Minor Alps album), 2013
"Get There", a song performed by the Danish singer Rikke Emma Niebuhr 
, a United States Navy patrol vessel in commission from 1917 to 1919